Midsalip, officially the Municipality of Midsalip (Subanen: Benwa Midsalip; Chavacano: Municipalidad de Midsalip), is a 4th class municipality in the province of Zamboanga del Sur, Philippines. According to the 2020 census, it has a population of 33,711 people.

Etymology
The town's name is from a Subanen word,"Migsalip" which means "to collect" or "accumulate".

History
Midsalip was formed as a municipality out of 21 barrios of the Municipality of Ramon Magsaysay and 6 barrios of the municipality of Dumingag on September 9, 1964, by virtue of Executive Order Number 94 signed by President Diosdado Macapagal. This did not last long, however, as it was dissolved on February 26, 1966, due to a Supreme Court decision regarding the legality of the funds disbursed by the municipal treasurer. As a result, Midsalip was reverted to barrio status. It was not until May 8, 1967, when the Republic Act No. 4871 was passed when Midsalip became a regular municipality again.

Geography

Climate

Barangays
Midsalip is politically subdivided into 33 barangays.

Demographics

Economy

References

External links
 Midsalip Profile at PhilAtlas.com
 [ Philippine Standard Geographic Code]
Philippine Census Information

Municipalities of Zamboanga del Sur
Establishments by Philippine executive order